Gu Jiegang (8 May 189325 December 1980) was a Chinese historian best known for his seven-volume work Gushi Bian (or Debates on Ancient History). He was a co-founder and the leading force of the Doubting Antiquity School, and was highly influential in the 20th century development of Chinese historiography.

Biography
Gu Jiegang was born two years before Qing Empire's defeat in the First Sino-Japanese War. The country during his early years was wrought with turmoil. During high school, Gu briefly joined a revolutionary group during the 1911 Revolution. However, he soon realized that he had "no personal aptitude for politics, and no ability in promoting great social movements". He developed an interest in history while being a student at Peking University, and resolved to use a new historical narrative to calm his country's social and political turmoil. He evacuated to Chongqing in the Second Sino-Japanese War and started studying the ethnic minorities in China, Muslims in particular.

When the Cultural Revolution started in 1966, Gu was labeled a Reactionary Scholarly Authority. He had to wear a dunce cap and was subjected to struggle sessions. He had to labor at the History Department every day until he was freed in the early 1970s.

Historiography
Gu has been viewed as something of an enigma by many scholars. His work has been characterized as scientific and anti-tradition, while at the same time showing pride in Chinese culture and believing that the Chinese identity would withstand modernization. The German scholar Ursula Richter characterized this discrepancy by labeling Gu "the traditional and yet modern scholar who was true to tradition also in that he 'obeyed yet resisted'".

According to Laurence Schneider, the "most persistent theme" in Gu's writings is "the central role of the intellectual in Chinese history, and the centrality of history to the Chinese intellectual".  He attributed China's failure to modernize to opportunistic intellectuals who allied with the aristocracy, rather than pursuing truth. In order to restore China to greatness, Gu, along with his mentor Hu Shih, advocated a non-political role for Chinese intellectuals, against the emerging trend of Marxist histories.

Based on the supposition that the modern Chinese nation must rethink its history in order to survive, to this end Gu used textual criticism to challenge traditional Chinese historiography. One example is the myth of the Three Sovereigns and Five Emperors, a supposed golden age in China's antiquity that had scarcely been doubted up to the early twentieth century. Gu questioned the historicity of this myth not only to rectify errors in understanding, but also to destroy the entire philosophy of history that revolved around looking back to this supposed golden age. Gu debunked the spurious past, says Schneider, to redefine “the idea of ‘Chinese’ through a process of reordering the relation of past and present”. Yet he believed China’s true past yielded “sources of radical inspiration both for destroying the old traditions and for creating and authorizing new ones.”

Gu also sought to provide the basis for a new national history with his theory of Chinese diversity, as opposed to continuity and homogeneity, the main assumptions of nationalist Sinocentrism. Gu took special delight in suggesting that there was barbarian blood under the skin of Sage King Yu of the Xia dynasty, whose existence he doubted in any case. Gu, observes Schneider, thought that “if a periodically failing Chinese civilization was revived by infusions of barbarian blood or culture, then how could it be said that the subsequent product was Chinese? How could it be said that it was a continuous, coherent tradition?” Gu thus wanted to destroy at its root “the idea that from time immemorial there was a transcendent unchanging Chinese essence.” For Gu, Chinese history was not merely the history of Confucianism; the content of the Chinese identity was “always in a state of change”.

Works

Relationship with Lu Xun
In 1927, Gu Jiegang threatened to sue his former colleague Lu Xun because he believed, quite correctly, that he was being mocked in Lu Xun's short story "Taming the Floods".

References

Further reading
  Online (LSE (Accepted version)))
 
 
 

1893 births
1980 deaths
Republic of China historians
People's Republic of China historians
Chinese sinologists
Chinese folklorists
Members of Academia Sinica
Writers from Suzhou
20th-century Chinese historians
Historians from Jiangsu
National University of Peking alumni